This is a list of notable people who are from Manitoba, Canada, or have spent a large part or formative part of their career in the province.

Business professionals

Lila Bell Acheson Wallace, co-founder of the Reader's Digest
Chip and Pepper, founders of Chip and Pepper California
Ida Albo, managing partner of the Fort Garry Hotel
Gerald Smedley Andrews, land surveyor, Order of Canada recipient
Izzy Asper, founder of Global Television Network
Lloyd Axworthy, politician and former UW President, Nobel prize nominee
Tom Axworthy, Canadian civil servant and younger brother of Lloyd Axworthy
G. Michael Bancroft, chemist and synchrotron scientist, first director of the Canadian Light Source
Kathy Bardswick, President and CEO, The Co-operators
Earl Barish, basketball coach and founder of Dickie Dee and Salisbury House
George Montegu Black II, businessman, father of Conrad Black
Bill Blaikie, NDP politician
Margaret Bloodworth, National Security Advisor (BA 1970)
Saidye Rosner Bronfman, wife of businessman Samuel Bronfman
Samuel Bronfman, distillery magnate
Mark Chipman, founder of True North Sports & Entertainment
David Culver, businessman, former CEO of Alcan
Brian Dickson, former Chief Justice of the Supreme Court of Canada
Waldron Fox-Decent, mediator, professor, Crown Corporation chairman
Sydney Halter, lawyer, former CFL Commissioner, Officer of the Order of Canada
Bob Hunter, co-founder of Greenpeace
F. Ross Johnson, former head of RJR Nabisco, featured in the book and film Barbarians at the Gate
Jim Ludlow, president & CEO of True North Sports & Entertainment
Guy Maddin, film director
Frances Gertrude McGill, criminologist
Peter Nygård, founder of Nygård International
Sylvia Ostry, economist
John Paskievich, film director and photographer
Howard Pawley, former Premier of Manitoba
John Draper Perrin, business professional
Bill Richardson, CBC radio host
James Armstrong Richardson, businessman, politician, airport in Winnipeg was named for him
James Armstrong Richardson Sr., father of James Armstrong Richardson
Irv Robbins, co-founder of Baskin-Robbins
Andrea Slobodian, reporter
Susan Thompson, former mayor of Winnipeg
Jim Treliving, founder of Boston Pizza
Omar Zakhilwal, Afghan Finance Minister as well as the Chief Economic Advisor to the President of Afghanistan

Athletes

Hockey

 Arron Asham 
 Reg Abbott
 Jim Agnew
 Clint Albright
Gary Aldcorn
 Bill Allum
 Carter Ashton
Doug Baldwin
 Cam Barker
 Andy Bathgate
 Ken Baumgartner
 Paul Baxter
 Gordie Bell
 Joe Bell
Gary Bergman
Garry Blaine
 Andy Blair
Rick Blight
 Lonny Bohonos
 Larry Bolonchuk
 Ryan Bonni
 Buddy Boone
 Jennifer Botterill, Olympic gold medal winner
Dick Bouchard
 Dan Bourbonnais
 Madison Bowey
 Ralph Bowman
 Jack Bownass
 Dustin Boyd
Wally Boyer
Darren Boyko
Bailey Bram
Rube Brandow
Andy Branigan
Duane Bray
Billy Breen
Delayne Brian
Gerry Brisson
Turk Broda
George Brown
Harold Brown
Larry Brown
Cecil Browne
Ray Brunel
Ed Bruneteau
Mud Bruneteau
Barry Brust
Al Buchanan
Fred Burchell
Bill Burega
Shawn Byram
Walter Byron
Ryan Caldwell
Don Caley
Matt Calvert
Jim Cardiff
Bruce Carmichael
Al Carr
Greg Carroll
Ed Chadwick
Art Chapman
Christian Chartier
Dave Chartier
Brad Chartrand
Wayne Chernecki
Stefan Cherneski
Rich Chernomaz
Real Chevrefils
Ron Chipperfield
Elliot Chorley
Bob Chrystal
Brad Church
Andrew Clark
Kevin Clark
Bobby Clarke
Brian Coates
Delaney Collins
Jim Collins
Red Conn
Jack Connolly
Cam Connor
Joe Cooper
Riley Cote
Art Coulter
Thomas Coulter
Adam Courchaine
Rosario Couture
Jimmy Creighton
Clifford Crowley
Joe Crozier
Wilf Cude
Barry Cullen
Brian Cullen
Cory Cyrenne
Joe Daley
Kimbi Daniels
Lorne Davis
Jordy Douglas
Kent Douglas
Red Dutton, Former NHL commissioner
Cody Eakin
Garry Edmundson
Joel Edmundson
Gary Emmons
Brian Engblom
Dean Evason
Bill Ezinicki
Theoren Fleury
Bill Folk
Frank Fredrickson
Byron Froese
Owen Fussey
Herb Gardiner
Chay Genoway
Butch Goring
Haldor Halderson, 1920 Olympic gold medalist (Winnipeg Falcons)
Al Hamilton
Travis Hamonic
Ted Harris
Andy Hebenton
Darren Helm
Phil Hergesheimer
Wally Hergesheimer
Bryan Hextall
Ron Hextall
Ike Hildebrand
Cecil Hoekstra
Quinton Howden
Dave Hrechkosy
Ted Irvine, father of wrestler Chris Jericho
Paul Jerrard
Ching Johnson
Jim Johnson
Eddie Johnstone
Jason Kasdorf
Mike Keane
Duncan Keith, Olympic gold medal winner
Julian Klymkiw
Aggie Kukulowicz
Ed Kullman
Gord Labossiere
Max Labovitch
Gord Lane
Pete Langelle
Derek Laxdal
Jamie Leach
Mike Leclerc
Grant Ledyard
Bryan Lefley
Chuck Lefley
Brendan Leipsic
Art Somers
Bob Leiter
Curtis Leschyshyn
Junior Lessard
Odie Lowe
Bill MacKenzie
Bill Masterton
Fred Maxwell
Dunc McCallum
Kevin McCarthy
Ab McDonald
Dave McDonald
 Jacob Micflikier
 Nick Mickoski, member Manitoba Sports Hall of Fame
 Bill Mosienko, member Hockey Hall of Fame
 Colton Orr
 James Patrick
 Steve Patrick
 Johnny Peirson
 Alf Pike
 Ken Reardon, member NHL Hall of Fame
 Terry Reardon
 Billy Reay
 James Reimer
 Mike Ridley
 Dunc Rousseau, WHA Winnipeg Jets player in the 1970s
 Terry Sawchuk, member Hockey Hall of Fame
Dave Semenko
Damon Severson
Patrick Sharp, 2010, 2013 and 2015 Stanley Cup Winner, 2014 Olympic gold medalist
Alex Shibicky
Ron Shudra
Warren Skorodenski
Art Somers
Emory Sparrow
Lorne Stamler
Wally Stanowski
Alexander Steen
Pete Stemkowski
Blair Stewart
Black Jack Stewart
Mark Stone
Billy Taylor
Jimmy Thomson
Kevin Todd
Jonathan Toews, Stanley cup winner 2010, 2013 & 2015
Lindsay Vallis
J.P. Vigier
Dale Weise
Duvie Westcott
Ian White
Neil Wilkinson
Carey Wilson
Bob Woytowich
Ken Wregget
Travis Zajac
Chick Zamick (1926–2007)

Basketball

Todd MacCulloch, NBA player
Chad Posthumus NBA player
Edward Dawson, 1936 Olympic team member
Joey Johnson, wheelchair basketball player, member of Manitoba's Basketball Hall of Fame
Bennie Lands, 1948 Olympic team member 
Martin Riley (basketball) Olympion
Bob Town 1976 Summer Olympics
Joey Vickery, pro player in Europe
Roy Williams, 1952 Olympic team member
Malcolm Wiseman, 1936 Olympic team member
Eric Bridgeland, coach
Carl Ridd Turned down an NBA contract
Roy Williams (Canadian basketball) 1952 Summer Olympics
Erfan Nasajpour in the Iranian Basketball Super League
Rick McNair basketball player and coach
BT Toews, coach and father of Kai Toews

Football

CFL players

Al Ackland
Donovan Alexander
Bill Baker
Keith Bennett
Lorne Benson
Mike Benson
Andy Bieber
Simon Blaszczak
Ken Bochen
Bill Boivin
James Bond
Brady Browne
Jack Bruzell
Zac Carlson
Jim Carphin
Bill Ceretti
Walter Chikowski
Scott Coe
Anthony Coombs
Billy Cooper
Bruce Covernton
Nic Demski
Brian Dobie
George Druxman
Leo Ezerins
Scott Flagel
Jim Furlong
Evan Gill
Roger Hamelin
John Hammond
Andrew Harris
Ben Hatskin
Cal Murphy, CFL Coach
Don Oramasionwu
T-Dre Player
Joe Poplawski

NFL players

Doug Brown
Geoff Gray
Rod Hill
Israel Idonije
Fred Vant Hull
T. J. Jones
Les Lear
David Onyemata
Chad Rempel
Mike Richardson
Bobby Singh
John Urschel

Wrestling

 Bob Brown, wrestler and former WWE referee 
 Kerry Brown, wrestler for Stampede Wrestling
 Don Callis, WWE and ECW wrestler
 Tony Condello, promoter
 Cathy Corino, TNA and Ring of Honor
 Steve Corino, WWE, TNA, and ECW wrestler
 Chi Chi Cruz, former WWE wrestler
 Allison Danger, TNA, and Ring of Honor star 
 Johnny Devine, former WWE and ECW wrestler
 Paul Diamond, former WWE wrestler
 Danny Duggan, WWE wrestler
 Anthony Durante, former WWE wrestler
 Robert Evans, TNA and Ring of Honor star
 George Gordienko, wrestled for Stampede Wrestling
 David Hohl, former Olympic wrestler
 Ricky Hunter, WWE and NWA wrestler 
 Chris Jericho, WWE wrestler
 Candice LeRae, NWA wrestler
 Tom Magee, WWE wrestler and power lifter 
 Vance Nevada, former NWA wrestler 
 Kenny Omega, WWE wrestler
 Fred Peloquin, AWA wrestler
 Rowdy Roddy Piper, WWE Hall of Famer
 Rosemary, TNA wrestler
 Courtney Rush, TNA wrestler
 Sarah Stock, TNA and Ring of Honor star 
 Al Tomko, AWA wrestler
 The Von Steigers, former WWE Tag team

Curling

 Dawn Askin
 Kerry Burtnyk
 Cathy Gauthier
 Steve Gould
 Don Duguid, sportscaster
 Randy Dutiaume
 Janet Harvey
 Jennifer Jones
 Connie Laliberte
 Carolyn McRorie, Olympic silver medal winner
 Jon Mead
 John Morris, Olympic gold medal winner
 B. J. Neufeld
 Chris Neufeld
 Denni Neufeld
 Jill Officer
 Cathy Overton-Clapham
 Gord Paterson
 Sam Penwarden
 Corinne Peters
 Daley Peters
 Vic Peters
 Kelly Scott
 Jeff Stoughton
 Bob Ursel
 Garry Van Den Berghe
 Ken Watson

Rugby

James Campbell, former rugby player
Jamie Cudmore, rugby player
Brian Erichsen, rugby player
Norm Hadley, former rugby player
Kevin Tkachuk, former rugby player
Amanda Thornborough, current Canada women's 15's rugby player

Golf

Isabelle Beisiegel
George Knudson
Margaret Todd
Harold Eidsvig
Bill Ezinicki
Dan Halldorson
Nick Taylor

Volleyball
Steven Brinkman
Wanda Guenette
Taylor Pischke
Michelle Sawatzky-Koop
Adam Simac

Track and field
Angela Chalmers, Olympic bronze medalist (track and field)
Cyril Coaffee, Olympic track and field athlete, member of Canada's Sports Hall of Fame
Joe Keeper, Olympic long-distance runner, Grandfather of Tina Keeper
Terry Fox, runner, cancer research activist, named "The Greatest Canadian"
Betty Fox, mother of Terry Fox, founder of the Terry Fox Foundation

Soccer (football)

George Anderson
Marco Bustos
Bob Harley
Robin Hart
Doug McMahon
Tony Nocita
Sophie Schmidt
Desiree Scott
Frederick Stambrook
Chelsea Stewart
Héctor Vergara, FIFA Referee
Troy Westwood

Martial arts

 Mark Berger, fighter
 Robin Black, MMA fighter
 Dominique Bosshart, Olympic medalist (taekwondo)
 Joe Doerksen, UFC fighter 
 Roland Delorme, UFC fighter 
 Baxter Humby, kick boxer, winner of an ESPY Award in the music video of "Renegades" in Spider-Man 3
 Brad Katona, UFC fighter 
 Donny Lalonde, MMA fighter and boxer
 Krzysztof Soszynski, UFC fighter on BuzzFeed in the movie Logan

Baseball

Martha Rommelaere, former All-American Girls Professional Baseball League player
Doris Barr, former All-American Girls Professional Baseball League player
Dottie Hunter, former All-American Girls Professional Baseball League player
Eleanor Callow, former baseball player 
Russ Ford, former MLB player
Gene Ford, former MLB player
Audrey Haine, baseball player
Mel Kerr, MLB player
Corey Koskie, MLB player
Olive Little, former All-American Girls Professional Baseball League player
Bud Sketchley, former MLB player
Evelyn Wawryshyn, former All-American Girls Professional Baseball League player

Others 
 David Chapman, cricketer
David Hart, water polo
Bon MacDougall, NASCAR racing driver
Joe Mazzucco, NASCAR racing driver
Damian Mills, cricketer
Rachel Riddell, water polo
Nic Youngblud, water polo
Winter sports
 Susan Auch, Olympic medalist (speed skating)
 Clara Hughes, 6-time Olympic gold medalist (cycling and speed skating)
 Cindy Klassen, 6-time Olympic medalist (speed skating)
 Doreen McCannell-Botterill, speed skater
Jon Montgomery, Olympic gold medalist (skeleton racing), host of The Amazing Race Canada

Religious leaders

Abishabis, Aboriginal leader
John Bruce, Aboriginal leader
Rod Bushie, Aboriginal leader
David Chartrand, Aboriginal leader
Ken Courchene, Aboriginal leader
Ron Evans, Aboriginal leader
Jerry Fontaine, Aboriginal leader
John Joseph Harper, Aboriginal leader
Alexandre-Antonin Taché, Archbishop of Saint Boniface, Manitoba
Tepastenam, Aboriginal leader
Marie-Louise Valade, established the Sisters of Charity at the Red River Mission
Frank Whitehead, Aboriginal leader

Singers, songwriters, musicians

Maria Aragon, performed with Lady Gaga also on The Ellen DeGeneres Show
Chad Allan, Juno Award-winning artist
Allan Kingdom, Grammy-nominated hip-hop artist 
Don Amero
Tom Cochrane, Grammy-nominated artist
Jeffrey Anderson, radio producer
W. H. Anderson
Randy Bachman
Tal Bachman
Tim Bachman
Del Barber
Ishq Bector
Steve Bell
Herbert Belyea
Bif Naked
Lloyd Blackman
Heather Blush
Oscar Brand
Lenny Breau
Jon Buller
Stephen Carroll
Marco Castillo
Tom Cochrane
Jason Churko
Amanda Cook
Chantal Kreviazuk
Burton Cummings
Mychael Danna
Victor Davies
Andy de Jarlis
Diz Disley
Mitch Dorge
Matt Epp
Ed Evanko
Christine Fellows
Brent Fitz
Ken Fleming
Fresh I.E.
Bryan Fustukian
Ian Gardiner
Heidi Gluck
Daniel Greaves
Frederick Grinke
David Guillas
Tim Harwill
Dianne Heatherington
Filmer Hubble
Terry Jacks
David James
Rob James
Gordie Johnson
Juliette
Jim Kale
James Keelaghan
Wab Kinew, now leader of the Manitoba NDP
Allan Kingdom
Ash Koley
Mark Korven
Chantal Kreviazuk
Joel Kroeker
Daniel Lavoie
Ashley Leitão
Greg Leskiw
Alana Levandoski
Cara Luft
Earl MacDonald
Gisele MacKenzie
Fraser MacPherson
Greg MacPherson
Keith Macpherson
Damian Marshall
Julie Masi
Romi Mayes
Donnie McDougall
Loreena McKennitt, Grammy-nominated artist
Holly McNarland
Glen Meadmore
Neil Merryweather
Amy Metcalfe
Jenn Mierau
Ruth Moody
Lorne Munroe
Zara Nelsova
Jon Neufeld
Tim Neufeld
Bob Nolan
Tiny Parham
Brandon Paris
Fred Penner
Julie Penner
Johnny Perrin
Randolph Peters
Garry Peterson
William Prince
Eric Radford
Jackie Rae
Donn Reynolds
Brad Roberts
Dan Roberts, bassist
Ashley Robertson
Bob Rock
John K. Samson
Bernie Senensky
Joey Serlin
Remy Shand, nominated for 4 Grammy awards 
Shingoose
Al Simmons
Son of Dave
Fred Turner
Venetian Snares
Lindy Vopnfjörð
Neil Young
Bill Wallace

Groups
Brother
Live on Arrival
Sagkeeng's Finest, winners of Canada's Got Talent

Actors/actresses

Ted Atherton, on Traders
Cameron Bancroft, on Supernatural
Adam Beach, in Suicide Squad
Robert Bockstael, on X-Men (series)
Steve Braun, in The Skulls III
Jay Brazeau, voice actor on Mega Man (1994 series)
Greg Bryk, in Immortals (2011) and The Incredible Hulk
Len Cariou, in Prisoners (2013)
Jonas Chernick, on The Best Laid Plans
Ari Cohen, on A Little Thing Called Murder
Michael Cohen, on Henry's World
Wallace Douglas, on Spies of the Air
Brian Drader, in Shall We Dance? (2004)
Ed Evanko, in Double Jeopardy (1999)
Tibor Feheregyhazi, actor
Brendan Fehr, in Guardians of the Galaxy
Darcy Fehr, in Desire (2000)
Ken Finkleman, in Grease 2
Daniel Gillies, in Spider-Man 2
Monty Hall, host of Let's Make a Deal
Joshua Henry, in The Scottsboro Boys
Tom Jackson, on Star Trek: The Next Generation
Gerald MacIntosh Johnston, in Little Friend
Richard Kahan, on Supernatural
Ryan Kennedy, in Scream (1996)
Terry Klassen, in Barbie
Jack Kruschen, on Batman
Jeremy Kushnier, actor 
Fletcher Markle, on Thriller 
Paul Maxwell, in Indiana Jones and the Last Crusade
Tom McCamus, on The Newsroom
Glen Meadmore, friends with John Wayne Gacy
Lee Montgomery, on The Million Dollar Duck
Peter Mooney, on Camelot
Bob Nolan, on Night Time in Nevada
John Paizs, on The Kids in the Hall
Ross Petty, in the X-Men film series
Douglas Rain, in The Man Who Skied Down Everest
Donnelly Rhodes, on The Golden Girls
Kenny Robinson, friends with Russell Peters and Vince Carter
Ron Rubin, Morph in X-Men
Ted Rusoff, on After Death
Aaron Schwartz (Canadian actor), on The Outside Chance of Maximilian Glick
Kerry Shale, on The Lion, the Witch and the Wardrobe (1988 series)
David Steinberg,  actor, 5-time Emmy Award-winner
Robert Tinkler, on Cyberchase, Beyblade, and Sailor Moon
Kristopher Turner, on Saving Hope
Ryan Ward (actor), on Son of the Sunshine
Marshall Williams, on How to Build a Better Boy
Ty Wood, in Keep Your Head Up, Kid: The Don Cherry Story
Ken Kostick, on The Food Network

Actresses

Nia Vardalos, in My Big Fat Greek Wedding
Nadia Litz, in The Mighty
Claire Adams, in The Big Valley
Martha Burns, on Mad Ship
Sarah Carter, on Smallville
Ma-Anne Dionisio, in Les Misérables
Heather Doerksen, in Pacific Rim (film)
Deanna Durbin, in For the Love of Mary
Melissa Elias, in Tamara (2005)
Ida Engel, on The Gong Show
Dianne Heatherington, on Zero Patience
Tina Keeper, on For Angela
Mimi Kuzyk, on A Christmas Wedding
Carla Lehmann, in Fame Is the Spur
Mara Marini, on Black-ish
Belinda Montgomery, in Tron: Legacy
Libby Morris, on Not Quite Paradise
Brooke Palsson, on Between (TV series)
Anna Paquin, in the X-Men film series and Phineas and Ferb
Dorothy Patrick, was married to Lynn Patrick
Shirley Patterson, on Batman serial
Gwynyth Walsh, Star Trek: The Next Generation and Supernatural, season 1
Catherine Wreford, on Wrestlemaniac
Tracy Spiridakos, on Revolution
Sonia Sui, in Toy Story 3
Sara Thompson, on The 100

Performers

Shawn Farquhar, magician on The Ellen DeGeneres Show
Amber Fleury, recording artist 
Deven Green, comedian
Dean Gunnarson, magician
Doug Henning, magician
Ashley Leitão 
Keith Macpherson 
Luke McMaster 
David Steinberg, comedian
Meaghan Waller, winner of Canada's Next Top Model
Zack Werner, judge
Brian Zembic, magician

War heroes

Leo Clarke, Victoria Cross winner 
Frederick William Hall, Victoria Cross winner in World War I
Coulson Norman Mitchell, Victoria Cross winner World War I
Andrew Charles Mynarski, Victoria Cross winner in World War II
Frank Pickersgill, SOE agent in World War II executed by the Nazis
Tommy Prince, highly decorated Aboriginal soldier with the Devil's Brigade in World War II
Robert Shankland, Victoria Cross winner in World War I
Sir William Stephenson (a.k.a. Intrepid), spy, man on whom the character of James Bond is based

Writers

David Bergen, novelist
Di Brandt, poet
Martha Brooks, writer
Norman Cantor, writer, historian
Solomon Cleaver, writer
Patrick Friesen, poet
Betty Gibson, author
Erving Goffman, writer, sociologist
Paul Hiebert, author
Edna Mayne Hull, science fiction writer
Guy Gavriel Kay, novelist and poet
Margaret Laurence, novelist
Jake MacDonald, novelist
Mary MacLane, writer
Bill Mason, author, filmmaker, environmentalist
Marshall McLuhan, writer, media theorist
Duncan Mercredi, poet
Casey Plett, author
David Robertson, author
Gabrielle Roy, author
Carol Shields, Pulitzer Prize–winning novelist
Joan Thomas, author
Miriam Toews, author
Andrew Unger, author
A. E. van Vogt, science fiction writer
Katherena Vermette, writer
Joshua Whitehead, author
Armin Wiebe, writer
Adele Wiseman, author
George Woodcock, writer

Cartoonists/characters

George Freeman, artist for several comic books including Captain Canuck
Eric Gurney, cartoonist for Disney
Roy Peterson, editorial 
cartoonist
Jon St. Ables, cartoonist
James Simpkins, creator of Jasper the Bear
Charles Thorson, creator of Bugs Bunny
Colin Upton, cartoonist
Winnie-the-Pooh, one of Disney's best-known characters, named for Winnipeg

Journalists

Ralph Allen
Jeffrey Anderson, radio producer
Ashleigh Banfield, TV host and ABC news reporter
Rosemary Barton, broadcaster for The National
Paul Boyd, reporter for Inside Edition
Barry Broadfoot
Bertram Brooker
Cecily Brownstone
Tyler Brûlé
George Fisher Chipman
Lisa R. Cohen, producer for the Oprah Winfrey Show
 John Wesley Dafoe
Suzanne Goldenberg
Dawna Friesen, NBC correspondent
Kaj Hasselriis
Ella Cora Hind
Bob Hunter, co-founder of Greenpeace
 Ben Metcalfe, former chairman of Greenpeace
 Don Newman, CBC broadcaster
 Scott Oake, sports broadcaster father of Britain's Got Talent contestant Darcy Oake
 Catherine Seipp
Linden Soles, CNN broadcaster 
Diana Swain, CBC broadcaster
 Brian Williams, sports broadcaster
 Larry Zolf

Scientists, medical professionals, and teachers

 Reg Alcock, former President of the Treasury Board of Liberal Prime Minister Paul Martin's cabinet
 Robert Archambeau, ceramic artist, Governor General's Award winner
 Arthur Henry Reginald Buller F.R.S.C., FRS, mycologist
 Patricia Churchland and Paul Churchland, former professors of philosophy, known for the school of eliminative materialism
 Jean Friesen, former Deputy Premier and Minister of Intergovernmental Affairs of NDP Premier Gary Doer's cabinet
 Aniruddha M. Gole, IEEE Fellow
 Frank Hawthorne F.R.S.C., mineral sciences professor
 Guy Maddin, film director and former professor
 Teresa McDonell, nun, nurse and teacher
 Nathan Mendelsohn, professor of mathematics
 Jim Peebles, Nobel Prize-winning physicist
 Zalman Schachter-Shalomi, major founder of the Jewish Renewal Movement
 Arthur Schafer, prominent ethicist, director of the Centre for Professional and Applied Ethics
 Carol Shields, Pulitzer Prize-winning author
 Vaclav Smil, energy systems scientist and policy analyst
 Robert Thirsk, Canadian astronaut, STS-78 shuttle mission
 H. C. Wolfart, professor of linguistics

Criminals

Gerald Blanchard, robber
Scott Bairstow, rapist
John Martin Crawford, serial killer
Larry Fisher, murderer and rapist
Del Fontaine, boxer and murderer
Ken Leishman, robber
Benjamin Levin, sex offender
Karl McKay, murderer
Earle Nelson, serial killer
Nicole Redhead, murderer

Murder victims
Tina Fontaine
John Joseph Harper
Helen Betty Osborne
Jaylene Redhead
Phoenix Sinclair

Wrongfully convicted of murder
James Driskell
David Milgaard
Thomas Sophonow

Politicians
This list mainly includes those people from Manitoba who had political careers outside of Manitoba, but also includes especially-notable people who had political careers within Manitoba (as presumably most Manitoba politicians are from Manitoba).

Douglas R. Archer, former mayor of Regina
Niki Ashton
Grant MacEwan, former mayor of Calgary
Candice Bergen
Rana Bokhari
Douglas Lloyd Campbell, Premier of Manitoba, longest-serving Manitoba MLA 
Maria Chaput
Thomas Crerar, Member of Parliament, Senator, leader of the Progressive Party, first politician appointed Companion of the Order of Canada
Marlene Cowling
Shari Decter Hirst
Bev Desjarlais
Dorothy Dobbie
Ruby Dhalla, Member of Parliament in Ontario
Tommy Douglas, father of Medicare in Canada
Ronald Duhamel, Veterans Affairs minister in the Jean Chrétien government
Elijah Harper, Native leader, Manitoba MLA
John Harvard, Member of Parliament, CBC broadcaster, Manitoba Lieutenant-Governor
S. I. Hayakawa, United States senator
Francis Lawrence Jobin, Manitoba Lieutenant-Governor
Stanley Knowles, Member of Parliament, Order of Canada recipient
Peter Liba, journalist, businessman, Manitoba Lieutenant-Governor
Sterling Lyon, Premier of Manitoba
Hugh John Macdonald, Premier of Manitoba and son of Canada's first prime minister (John A. Macdonald)
John Stewart McDiarmid, Manitoba Lieutenant-Governor
Pearl McGonigal, Manitoba Lieutenant-Governor
William John McKeag, Manitoba Lieutenant-Governor
Gerry McGeer, former mayor of Vancouver
Daniel Hunter McMillan, Manitoba Lieutenant-Governor
Roland Fairbairn McWilliams, Manitoba Lieutenant-Governor
Arthur Meighen, Prime Minister of Canada
Darrell Pasloski, Premier of Yukon
Jack Pickersgill, former MP representing Newfoundland
Louis Riel, Metis leader, Member of Parliament
Dufferin Roblin, Premier of Manitoba
Denise Savoie, British Columbia Member of Parliament, Assistant Deputy Speaker of the House of Commons
Edward Schreyer, Premier of Manitoba, Governor General of Canada
John Christian Schultz, Manitoba Lieutenant-Governor
Alfred Henry Scott, Louis Riel delegate
Mitchell Sharp, Liberal federal cabinet minister
William Johnston Tupper, Manitoba Lieutenant-Governor
Daniel Vandal
Larissa Waters, Australian senator
J. S. Woodsworth, Member of Parliament, first leader of CCF

Notable families 

 Asper family — Izzy Asper, founder of Global Television Network
 David Asper
 Gail Asper
 Leonard Asper
 Black family — George Montegu Black Sr., businessman
 Conrad Black, newspaper publisher
 George Montegu Black II, 1950s' president of Canadian Breweries
 David Culver, former CEO of Alcan (father's sister was the maternal grandmother of Conrad Black).
 Richardson family — James Richardson, businessman and founder of James Richardson & Sons 
 James Armstrong Richardson Sr., businessman, grandson of James Richardson
 James Armstrong Richardson II, businessman and politician, for whom the Winnipeg airport was named
 Agnes Benidickson (raised in Winnipeg), first female chancellor of Queen's University at Kingston, Ontario
 William Moore Benidickson, Dauphin-born Member of Parliament for Kenora—Rainy River, husband of Agnes Benidickson
 Kathleen M. Richardson, philanthropist

Other notable people 

 David Reimer, man raised as a girl who became a famous case in sexology

References 

 
 Manitobans